Walid Ali Osman  (born 28 February 1977 in Libya) is a Libyan football defender currently playing for Al-Ittihad. He is a member of the Libya national football team.

External links

Player profile with Photo – Sporting-heroes.net
Player profile – MTN Africa Cup of Nations 2006

1977 births
Living people
Libyan footballers
Association football defenders
Libya international footballers
2006 Africa Cup of Nations players
People from Sabratha